Protected areas of Slovakia are areas that need protection because of their environmental, historical or cultural value to the nation. Protected areas in Slovakia are managed by institutions and organizations governed by the Ministry of the Environment.

Types of protected areas:
National Park (abbr. NP)
Protected Landscape Area (Chránená krajinná oblasť; CHKO)
National Nature Reserve (Národná prírodná rezervácia; NPR)
Nature Reserve (Prírodná rezervácia; PR)
National Nature Monument (Národná prírodná pamiatka; NPP)
Nature Monument (Prírodná pamiatka; PP)
Protected Site (Chránený areál; CHA)
Protected Landscape Element (Chránený krajinný prvok; CHKP)
Protected Bird Area* (Chránené vtáčie územie; CHVÚ) *Technically Special Protection Area (SPA) under the EU Bird's Directive
Protected Tree (Chránený strom; CHS)

National Parks

Protected Landscape Areas
Little Carpathians Protected Landscape Area (CHKO Malé Karpaty)
White Carpathians Protected Landscape Area (CHKO Biele Karpaty)
Cerová vrchovina Protected Landscape Area (CHKO Cerová vrchovina)
Dunajské luhy Protected Landscape Area (CHKO Dunajské luhy)
Horná Orava Protected Landscape Area (CHKO Horná Orava)
Kysuce Protected Landscape Area (CHKO Kysuce)
Latorica Protected Landscape Area (CHKO Latorica)
Poľana Protected Landscape Area (CHKO Poľana)
Ponitrie Protected Landscape Area (CHKO Ponitrie)
Strážov Mountains Protected Landscape Area (CHKO Strážovské vrchy)
Štiavnica Mountains Protected Landscape Area (CHKO Štiavnické vrchy)
Vihorlat Protected Landscape Area (CHKO Vihorlat)
East Carpathians Protected Landscape Area (CHKO Východné Karpaty)
Záhorie Protected Landscape Area (CHKO Záhorie)

Other
For the list of National Nature Reserves, Nature Reserves, National Nature Monuments, Nature Monuments, and Protected Sites, see the State Inventory of Specially Protected Parts of Nature and Landscape

For the list of Protected Trees, see enviroportal.sk .

National Nature Reserves
Belianske Tatras
Devínska Kobyla
Morské oko
Strážov
Stužica

Protected Sites

 Okšov oaks

History
Between the years 1994 – 2006 the following Protected Sites were cancelled: 
 CHA Červený rak
 CHA Hradná zeleň
 CHA Koliba
 CHA Mirovského záhrada
 CHA Nemocničný park
 CHA Vešeléniho záhrada
 CHA Vodárenská zeleň
 CHA Záhrada na Búdkovej
 CHA Zeleň pri vodárni
The CHKO Malé Karpaty was reduced with the Sitina part no longer protected. In the same time-frame a new Protected Landscape Area was created, the Dunajské luhy Protected Landscape Area.

References

External links
National Parks of Slovakia at Slovakia.travel
Protected Landscape Areas of Slovakia at Slovakia.travel